Schwedenplatz  is a station on  and  of the Vienna U-Bahn. It is located at the Schwedenplatz square in the Innere Stadt District. It opened in 1979. It used to be known as Stadtbahn.

References

External links 
 

Buildings and structures in Innere Stadt
Railway stations opened in 1979
Vienna U-Bahn stations
1979 establishments in Austria
Railway stations in Austria opened in the 20th century